Cracking Up is a 1994 American comedy-drama film directed by Matt Mitler and starring Mitler, Carolyn McDermott and Debra Wilson.

Cast
Matt Mitler as Danny Gold
Carolyn McDermott as Carolyn
Jason Brill as Jake Weinberg
Kimberly Flynn	as Kimberly
Chuck Montgomery as Lucky Jackson
Debra Wilson
David Wells as Alan
Kevin Brown as Dack
Debra K. Lynn	as Hazel

References

External links
 
 

American comedy-drama films
1990s English-language films
1990s American films